Louis Douglas Serrurier (9 December 1920 in Germiston – 4 June 2006) was a racing driver and racing car constructor from South Africa. He participated in 3 Formula One World Championship Grands Prix in the 1960s, only racing in the South African Grand Prix event, debuting on 29 December 1962.  He scored no championship points.

Racing car constructor
Serrurier built a series of racing cars under the name of LDS, after his initials. The first was based on a Cooper, and later cars were based on Brabhams. The cars were raced mainly by Serrurier himself, and Sam Tingle. From the Cobra Club South Africa:
"Louis Douglas Serrurier built about 20 LDS Cobras during the course of his race car building history. They were all once offs, with different engine, chassis, suspension and brakes depending on the year they were built".

A handful of other custom built bodies found their home on LDS chassis in the 70s. Mainly laid up from fibreglass, but also aluminium Coupe and Convertibles.

Racing record

Complete Formula One World Championship results
(key)

Non-Championship Formula One results
(key)

References

External links
Profile on historicracing.com 

1920 births
2006 deaths
LDS Formula One drivers
People from Germiston
South African Formula One drivers
South African racing drivers
Sportspeople from Gauteng
South African automobile designers